San Bernardo   is one of the 39 municipalities of Durango, in north-western Mexico. The municipal seat lies at San Bernardo. The municipality covers an area of 2078 km².

As of 2010, the municipality had a total population of 3,433, down from 3,726 as of 2005. 

The municipality had 109 localities, none of which had a population over 1,000.

References

Municipalities of Durango